The New world lexicon of Tolnai (Hungarian "Tolnai új világlexikona") is an old Hungarian lexicon series, in fact a renewed and expanded edition of the former World lexicon of Tolnai. Under the name Tolnai lexicon, we usually think of this series, not only because the previous initiative was unfortunately interrupted, but also because its material is fresher, it does not overlap so much with its predecessors.

Electronic edition 

The work does not have a reprint edition, but it does have an electronic edition. This is available on Arcanum.hu, in the form of a fee. The series can be considered common in antique shops, so obtaining original pieces is still relatively easy today.

Order of volumes

Sources

Egyéb hivatkozások 
 Tolnai világlexikona CD-ROM. Szöveg és kép. Budapest, Woodstone Interactive Kft., 1999. (1 CD-ROM) – Eredeti nyomtatott kiadása: „Tolnai új világlexikona” Budapest, Tolnai, 1926-1933.
 Tolnai világlexikona CD-ROM. Budapest, Channel 42, 1999., Digitális lexikon sorozat (1 CD-ROM).
 volumes of the work

Hungarian encyclopedias